A British High Commission is a British diplomatic mission, equivalent to an embassy, found in countries that are members of the Commonwealth of Nations. Their general purpose is to provide diplomatic relationships as well as travel information, passports, dual-citizenship information, and other services between Commonwealth states.

Where some Commonwealth countries are not represented in another Commonwealth country, the British High Commission can assist such Commonwealth countries' citizens in some cases.

Some countries that were outside the Commonwealth, but have now returned to their membership of the Commonwealth, have replaced their embassies and ambassadors with High Commissions and High Commissioners.

List of British High Commissions and British High Commissioners

 High Commission of the United Kingdom, Abuja, Nigeria – Catriona Laing (since November 2018)
 High Commission of the United Kingdom, Accra, Ghana – Iain Walker (since August 2017)
 High Commission of the United Kingdom, Apia, Samoa – David Ward (since 2019)
 High Commission of the United Kingdom, Bandar Seri Begawan, Brunei – John Virgoe (since 2020)
 High Commission of the United Kingdom, Banjul, Gambia – David Belgrove (since 2020)
 High Commission of the United Kingdom, Belmopan, Belize – Claire Evans (since October 2018)
 High Commission of the United Kingdom, Bridgetown – Scott Furssedonn-Wood (since 2021)
 High Commission of the United Kingdom, Canberra, Australia – Victoria Treadell (since March 2019)
 High Commission of the United Kingdom, Castries, St. Lucia – see Bridgetown, Barbados High Commission of the United Kingdom, Colombo, Sri Lanka – Sarah Hulton (since August 2019)
 High Commission of the United Kingdom, Dar es Salaam, Tanzania – David Concar (since August 2020) 
 High Commission of the United Kingdom, Dhaka, Bangladesh – Robert Chatterton Dickson (since March 2019)
 High Commission of the United Kingdom, Freetown, Sierra Leone – Simon Mustard (since April 2019)
 High Commission of the United Kingdom, Gaborone, Botswana – Sian Price (since February 2020)
 High Commission of the United Kingdom, Georgetown, Guyana – Jane Miller (since 2021)
 High Commission of the United Kingdom, Honiara, Solomon Islands – Thomas Coward (since 2019)
 High Commission of the United Kingdom, Islamabad, Pakistan – Christian Turner (since 2019)
 High Commission of the United Kingdom, Kampala, Uganda – Kate Airey (since 2019)
 High Commission of the United Kingdom, Kigali, Rwanda – Joanne Lomas (since January 2018)
 High Commission of the United Kingdom, Kingston, Jamaica – Judith Slater (since 2021)
 High Commission of the United Kingdom, Kuala Lumpur, Malaysia – Charles Hay (since March 2019)
 High Commission of the United Kingdom, Lilongwe, Malawi – David Beer (since September 2020)
 High Commission of the United Kingdom, Lusaka, Zambia – Nicholas Woolley (since August 2019)
 High Commission of the United Kingdom, Maputo, Mozambique – NneNne Iwuji-Eme (since August 2018)
 High Commission of the United Kingdom, Maseru, Lesotho - Anne Macro (since 2019)
 High Commission of the United Kingdom, Mbabane, Eswatini - Simon Boyden (since 2020)
 High Commission of the United Kingdom, Nairobi, Kenya – Jane Marriott (since September 2019)
 High Commission of the United Kingdom, Nassau, The Bahamas - Sarah Dickson (since 2019)
 High Commission of the United Kingdom, New Delhi, India – Alexander Ellis (since 2021)
 High Commission of the United Kingdom, Nicosia, Cyprus – Stephen Lillie (since April 2018)
 High Commission of the United Kingdom, Nukuʻalofa, Tonga – Thorhilda Abbott-Watt (since January 2020)
 High Commission of the United Kingdom, Ottawa, Canada – Susannah Goshko (since 2021)
 High Commission of the United Kingdom, Port Louis, Mauritius – Keith Allan (since 24 August 2017)
 High Commission of the United Kingdom, Port Moresby, Papua New Guinea – Keith Scott (since September 2018)
 High Commission of the United Kingdom, Port of Spain, Trinidad and Tobago – Harriet Cross (since September 2020)
 High Commission of the United Kingdom, Port Vila, Vanuatu – Karen Bell (since 2019)
 High Commission of the United Kingdom, Pretoria, South Africa – Antony Phillipson (since 2021)
 High Commission of the United Kingdom, Singapore, Singapore – Kara Owen (since July 2019)
 High Commission of the United Kingdom, Suva, Fiji – Brian Jones (since 2022)
 High Commission of the United Kingdom, Valetta, Malta – Stuart Gill (since April 2016)
 High Commission of the United Kingdom, Victoria, Seychelles – Patrick Lynch (August 2019)
 High Commission of the United Kingdom, Wellington, New Zealand – Laura Clarke (since January 2018)
 High Commission of the United Kingdom, Windhoek, Namibia – Charles Moore (since 2021)
 High Commission of the United Kingdom, Yaounde, Cameroon'' – Rowan Laxton (since October 2017)

See also

High commissioner (Commonwealth)
Diplomatic missions of the United Kingdom

References

Commonwealth of Nations
United Kingdom and the Commonwealth of Nations
Diplomatic missions of the United Kingdom